Pisces B (Psc B) is a void dwarf galaxy. It is located in the Local Void, near Pisces A; and is in the Pisces constellation. It is 30 million light-years (9.2 megaparsecs) away from the Earth. The galaxy was discovered with the WIYN Observatory. About 100 million years ago, the galaxy started moving out of the void and into the local filament zone and denser gaseous environment. This sparked off a doubling of the rate of star formation.

References

Further reading
 

Pisces (constellation)
Dwarf galaxies